Flight 498 may refer to:

Aeroflot Flight 498, crashed on 14 June 1981
Aeroméxico Flight 498, crashed on 31 August 1986
Crossair Flight 498, crashed on 10 January 2000

0498